The 2011–13 International Challenge Trophy is the fourth edition of the International Challenge Trophy.

Group A

Table

Matches

Group B

Table

Matches

Knock-out stage

Semi-finals

Final

References

International Challenge Trophy
Challenge
Challenge